Oregon station is a historic train station in the Ogle County, Illinois county seat of Oregon. The depot was listed on the National Register of Historic Places in July 1997 as the Chicago, Burlington and Quincy Railroad Depot.

Architecture
This former railroad depot possesses stone and brick walls. The building stands on a concrete foundation and has a ceramic tile roof. There also is some stucco work in the structure. It was constructed around 1913 and designed by the firm of T.S. Leake & Company.

Significance
The Chicago, Burlington and Quincy Railroad Depot in Oregon, Illinois was listed on the National Register of Historic Places on July 25, 1997 for its significance in transportation.

See also
Chicago, Burlington and Quincy Railroad

Notes

External links

Railway stations on the National Register of Historic Places in Illinois
National Register of Historic Places in Ogle County, Illinois
Oregon, Illinois
Oregon, Illinois
Former railway stations in Illinois
Buildings and structures in Ogle County, Illinois